Sakhile Hlatshwayo (5 July 1998 – 7 August 2021), known professionally as Killer Kau, he was a South African singer , dancer and record producer best known for his hit songs "Tholukuthi Hey" and "Amaneighbour"

Early life and career
Killer Kau was born on 5 July 1998 in Soweto, South Africa. He grew up singing in church before he joined the Stay PC church choir, singing baritone. He also went on to join the African Heavenly Soul Singers male choir.

His music career began when he was still attending school and when he wrote his matric in 2017. He rose to fame when he posted a video singing his song "Tholukuthi Hey", which went viral and caught the attention of DJ Ephonik.

Awards and nominations

Death
On 7th August 2021, Killer Kau died in a car crash on his way to a gig, alongside amapiano musician Mpura and the upcoming artists The Voice,Thando Tot and Thando Td. The car crash left only one female alive, the lady claimed to be one of Mpura and Killer Kau friends.

References

External links
 

1998 births
2021 deaths
Amapiano musicians
South African rappers
South African dancers
People from Soweto
Road incident deaths in South Africa